Gavin Rolf Larsen (born 27 September 1962) is a former New Zealand cricketer who specialised in the art of economical bowling. He was known playfully by his teammates as "The Postman". He is currently chief selector for the national side.

Domestic career
Unusually for a New Zealand player, he played his entire first-class career with one team, Wellington. He also captained the side in the 1994 Australasian Cup in Sharjah in the United Arab Emirates, where New Zealand reached the semi-finals of a six-team tournament.

His nickname of "The Postman" came about as a compliment:
"John Graham, New Zealand's team manager during much of his career, explained the nickname in the foreword to Larsen's book Grand Larseny (yes, really): "He is the consummate professional, committed, conscientious, competitive and consistent. His nickname of 'The Postman' sums him up well, he always delivers!""

International career
Larsen finished his career with an exceptional economy rate in ODI cricket of 3.76 – the norm at the time was usually somewhere between 4 and 4.50 – in his 121 ODIs, stretching over a ten-year span. 

He also played eight Tests with reasonable success, taking 24 wickets. However, as a useful batsman and handy bowler, he held a place in the one-day side and played a major part in New Zealand reaching the semi-final stage of the 1999 Cricket World Cup. 

Larsen earned his 100th ODI wicket in his home-town of Wellington, claiming the prize scalp of Indian batsman Sachin Tendulkar.

After cricket
Larsen was formerly chief executive of Cricket Wellington, leaving the post in October 2011 after four years. He was appointed on July 8, 2015 as a selector of the New Zealand cricket team.

References

External links

1962 births
Living people
New Zealand One Day International captains
New Zealand One Day International cricketers
Cricketers at the 1992 Cricket World Cup
Cricketers at the 1996 Cricket World Cup
Cricketers at the 1999 Cricket World Cup
New Zealand Test cricketers
New Zealand cricketers
Wellington cricketers
New Zealand cricket commentators
People educated at Onslow College
North Island cricketers